RC Aia Kutasi is a Georgian rugby union team.  Aia Kutasi was one of the best teams of the Soviet Union, holding three national titles, in 1987, 1988 and 1989. Since the dissolution of the Soviet Union, Aia Kutaisi has been one of the best teams of Georgia; they held 10 national titles, both as a Soviet republic and as an independent country.

Honours

Stadium
Aia Arena was built in 2015 year. it is located in 9 ha Territory in Kutaisi and includes 4 fields.

Current squad
2020/21

Notable former players 
   Zurab Zhvania

See also
Georgia national rugby union team
Georgia Rugby Union
Rugby union in Georgia
Georgia Championship
Georgia Cup
Georgia at the Rugby World Cup

External links 
https://web.archive.org/web/20110721025850/http://www.aia-rugby.ge/
http://www.rugby.ge/
http://www.irb.com/
http://www.fira-aer-rugby.com/

AIA
Sport in Kutaisi